Merritt is an unincorporated community in Chelan County, Washington, United States. Merritt is on U.S. Route 2 in the upper valley area along Nason Creek in the Wenatchee National Forest, located 20 miles west of downtown Leavenworth. Merritt is assigned the ZIP code 98826. Steep slopes surround the community, rising to more than 8,000 feet in the Chiwaukum Mountains to the south.

Merritt is on the Lake Wenatchee U.S. Geological Survey Map.

References

Unincorporated communities in Chelan County, Washington
Unincorporated communities in Washington (state)